Crinan is a name of Gaelic origin and it has a number of contexts:

 Crinan, Argyll, a village in Scotland
 The Crinan Canal, a waterway in Scotland with one of its outlets at Crinan, linking Loch Fyne with Loch Crinan
 Crínán of Dunkeld, a powerful Scottish lord around the beginning  of the 11th Century and the father of Duncan I of Scotland
 Crinan is a statistical area in Appleby, a suburb of Invercargill, New Zealand